YSFlight is a free, open-source multi-platform flight simulator, developed and published by Soji Yamakawa since 1999. Since its initial release, it has received annual updates, with the most recent stable version released in 2018.

History
Development of YSFlight began in 1998 as a solo project by Soji Yamakawa. He first started working on the simulator as a school project; afterwards, it was further developed into a flight aid for others who need assistance in understanding aircraft flight instrumentation and flight physics. Initially designed to be run by lower-end computers, the flight simulator began to implement more updated graphical features with its 2015 release. 

On August 19th, 2022, Yamakawa published YSFlight's source code and assets to GitHub under the BSD-3-Clause license, while stating that he intends to continue the simulator's development.

Features
YSFlight differs from other simulators, such as the Microsoft Flight Simulator series, in its intentionally low-detail graphical design. This allows the simulator to be run by lower-end computers, with system requirements being much less than most other flight simulators.

It allows for to YSFlight clients to join a multiplayer server. 

The simulator comes with a selection of 73 aircraft models and 16 maps, which range from real life locations (including the default map, a depiction of Japan's Aomori Prefecture) to fictitious maps.

See also

FlightGear
Microsoft Flight Simulator
X-Plane (simulator)
GEFS-Online

References

External links 
 

1999 video games
Formerly proprietary software
Freeware games
Flight simulation video games
General flight simulators
Open-source video games
Software using the BSD license